United Nations Security Council resolution 651, adopted unanimously on 29 March 1990, after recalling resolutions 598 (1987), 619 (1988), 631 (1989) and 642 (1989), and having considered a report by the Secretary-General Javier Pérez de Cuéllar on the United Nations Iran–Iraq Military Observer Group, the Council decided:

(a) to call on both Iran and Iraq to implement Resolution 598;
(b) to renew the mandate of the United Nations Iran–Iraq Military Observer Group for another six months until 30 September 1990;
(c) to request the Secretary-General to report on the situation and the measures taken to implement Resolution 598 at the end of this period.

See also
 Iran–Iraq relations
 Iran–Iraq War
 List of United Nations Security Council Resolutions 601 to 700 (1987–1991)

References
Text of the Resolution at undocs.org

External links
 

 0651
 0651
1990 in Iran
1990 in Iraq
March 1990 events